Kings Creek is a creek in eastern Ontario, Canada. It is a right tributary of the Jock River. It should not be confused with Kings Creek, a tributary of the Mississippi River (Ontario) nearby to the west.

See also
List of rivers of Ontario

References

Rivers of Lanark County
Rivers of Ottawa